Sherut Leumi (lit. National Service) is an alternative voluntary national service in Israel for those who are ineligible for service in the Israel Defense Forces or object to serving in the army, mostly for religious Jewish girls, although also for candidates of both genders with other reasons.

History
The majority who receive an exemption from the obligatory army service are Jewish women from the Religious Zionist sector, and they receive it by declaring religious observance, as they maintain that a large number of religious observances for women cannot be upheld in the military, such as dress codes and modesty issues. However, there are also a small number of men who serve in Sherut Leumi. Volunteers are between the ages of 18 and 21. Service typically requires working 30–40 hours/week over 12 to 24 months. Volunteers have the option of doing either one or two years of the National Service. Not all volunteers are Israeli citizens. It can be done on a tourist visa, and the volunteer will later receive a special volunteer visa that lasts as long as the person will be doing their service.

Haredi men who maintain that Torah study is their way of defending Israel are exempted under the Torato Umanuto arrangement. Arab citizens of Israel who are mostly Muslims are also exempted, in order to avoid a conflict between allegiance to their country and to their Arab families (a decision originally taken by Israel's first Prime Minister, David Ben-Gurion). Some Israeli conscientious objectors who object to serving in the army, but are not eligible for an exemption, have voiced a wish to do an alternative form of national service instead.

In 2012, Israel's cabinet extended military service exemption for 1,300 Haredi Yeshiva students as part of the Shirut Le'umi Mishmar. This allows Yeshiva students to join national service, as opposed to joining the IDF. As part of the scheme, the defense minister is obliged to postpone the military service of Yeshiva students approved for national civil service, and who are at least 26 years old, or are at least 22 years old and have at least one child.

Programs
The majority work in schools, but can also work in places such as special education, administration, hospitals, law, geriatrics, nursing homes, health clinics, teens at risk, internal security, disadvantaged communities, immigrant assistance, and many other organizations. Acceptance is based on an interview via a placement organizations that try to find the youth appropriate skills, interests, and needs.

Placement organizations
There are four main placement organizations for Sherut Leumi. They are the Agudah LeHitnadvut (lit. Volunteering Union), Shlomit, Aminadav, and Bat Ami. Each volunteer is then assigned to a coordinator (rakezet), who serves as a supervisor and adviser for the youth throughout their time in Sherut Leumi.

Benefits
Bnot Sherut (lit. female youth in the service) and Bnei Sherut (lit. male youth in the service) are entitled to a number of benefits during their service. Many of these benefits are the same as what a soldier serving in the army receives. They include:
 A monthly stipend for necessities. The mount varies with location and type of service, though usually it is approximately 600 Shekels a month.
 Apartment housing in the city where they are serving.
 Free bus rides across the country (except in Eilat) and (since 2001) free train rides.
 Discounts offered by various business establishments.
 Social programs such as weekend getaways, tours, learning programs, and parties.
 (for foreign volunteers)  private medical insurance.

Weekly classes are often available, and sometimes required, on various Judaism-related subjects.

At the end of the service, the Israeli volunteers receive a grant that can be used for things such as education, buying a house, or paying for a wedding.

National Service for Israeli Arabs
Rather than volunteer for army service, young people who are Arab citizens of Israel have the option to volunteer for this alternative national service and receive benefits similar to those received by discharged soldiers. The volunteers are generally allocated to Arab populations, where they assist with social and community matters. , there were 1,473 Arabs volunteering for national service. According to sources in the national service administration, Arab leaders are counseling youths to refrain from performing services to the Israeli state. According to a National Service official, "For years the Arab leadership has demanded, justifiably, benefits for Arab youths similar to those received by discharged soldiers. Now, when this opportunity is available, it is precisely these leaders who reject the state's call to come and do the service, and receive these benefits".

See also
Conscription in Israel
National service
National Youth Service
Religion in Israel
Status quo (Israel)
Torah study commandment
Torato Umanuto - The special arrangement whereby Torah scholars who do not belong to the Religious Zionism sector are exempted from military service. This particularly applies to Haredi Jews
Hesder - Rav Yehuda Amital's concept combining Torah study and military service, mainly in the Religious Zionism ("National Religious") sector
Tal committee (the "Tal law")

References

External links
Sherut Leumi on the Israeli Welfare Ministry website
Aguda LeHitnadvut
Amindav
Bat Ami
Shlomit
Nefesh B'Nefesh guide to Sherut Leumi

Non-profit organizations based in Israel
Conscription in Israel
Society of Israel